H.B. Fuller Company is a major American adhesives manufacturing company supplying industrial adhesives worldwide. 
The company has long received praise in ethical investment circles for such things as careful handling of toxic waste and the nature reserve built around its headquarters. Despite this image, it faced a controversy over glue-sniffing in Latin America in the 1990s.

As of 2018, the company ranks 873 on the Fortune 1000.

History
The company was founded in 1887 by Harvey Benjamin Fuller as a one-man wallpaper-paste shop. Initially incorporated as the Fuller Manufacturing Company, in 1915 the company reincorporated as the H.B. Fuller Company. 
Elmer Andersen, who later became governor of Minnesota,  served as the company's CEO in the 1940s. 
After beginning his political career, he became a part-time company president, though Andersen remained involved with the company for many years, stepping down as chairperson in 1992. H.B. Fuller became a publicly held company in 1968.

Glue sniffing controversy
In the 1990s, the company faced controversy over the glue-sniffing epidemic among street children in Latin America. A Fuller company brand, Resistol glue, was abused among these children to a sufficient extent that glue-sniffing children were called "resistoleros" regardless of the brand of glue 
being abused. A lawsuit filed against the company over the death of a Guatemalan teenager from sniffing glue was dismissed in 1996 due to lack of jurisdiction.
The controversy eventually led to the company's withdrawal from the Latin American market.

References

External links
 Official website

Companies listed on the New York Stock Exchange
Chemical companies of the United States
Manufacturing companies based in Minnesota
Chemical companies established in 1887
1887 establishments in Minnesota
Companies based in Minnesota